Stanton Barrett Motorsports is an American professional stock car racing team that last competed in the NASCAR Camping World Truck Series. The team is owned by driver and Hollywood stuntman Stanton Barrett.

Nationwide Series
The team began in 2002 as Red Racing in the NASCAR Busch Series fielding the No. 91 Bojangles'/Odoban Ford. The team ran twelve races that year with a top finish of 21st at Nashville and Charlotte. The team returned again in 2003 after Stanton's release from Roush Racing for seven races and ran various manufacturers. The team would only end up finishing one race and that would be in the 30th position at Charlotte. For the 2004 season the team returned to the Busch Series as Stanton Barrett Racing for 16 races. The team ran Pontiac's and Chevrolet's throughout the season and received most of the sponsorship from AmericInn Lodging Systems. At the Meijer 300 the team fielded two cars, one for Shawna Robinson and one for Stanton Barrett, however only Barrett would qualify for the race. SBR would have a best finish of 18th at both the Milwaukee Mile and Richmond. After attempting no Busch races in 2005 and making one in 2006, the team made a limited schedule in 2007, with Barrett making fifteen races in the No. 30 Chevrolet and getting a best finish of seventeenth three times. Danny O'Quinn and Jeff Fuller made one-race attempts for Barrett as well.

In 2008, Barrett began running the No. 30 for Stanton Barrett Motorsports, and used the No. 31 as a companion car for the team. Kenny Hendrick made the most starts in the car, while Fuller and Shane Huffman also made brief appearances in the car. The team merged with Ware Racing Enterprises at the end of the year.

Nextel Cup Series

Car No. 95 history
Barrett started his own Cup team in 2005 following his release from Front Row Motorsports. The team made four races of the seven races it attempted with his best finish being a 41st at Bristol Motor Speedway in August driving the No. 95. In the 2006 season, SBM attempted 15 and made six races with a best finish of 33rd at Phoenix. The team ended the season with sponsorship from QualityMetric though a partnership with Ware Racing.

Camping World Truck Series

Truck No. 91 history
The team returned in 2015, and also attempting to make the Truck Series debut with Barrett driving the No. 91 Chevrolet Silverado sponsored by Navy Seals vs. Zombies at Talladega.

External links 

Companies based in North Carolina
NASCAR teams